La Défense is a major business district in France, located  west of the city limits of Paris. It is part of the Paris metropolitan area in the Île-de-France region, located in the department of Hauts-de-Seine in the communes of Courbevoie, La Garenne-Colombes, Nanterre, and Puteaux.

Around its Grande Arche and esplanade ("le Parvis"), La Défense contains many of the Paris urban area's tallest high-rises. Les Quatre Temps, a large shopping mall in La Défense, has 220 stores, 48 restaurants and a 24-screen movie theatre.

The district is located at the westernmost extremity of the  Axe historique ("historical axis") of Paris, which starts at the Louvre in Central Paris and continues along the Champs-Élysées, well beyond the Arc de Triomphe along the Avenue de la Grande Armée before culminating at La Défense. The district is centred in an orbital motorway straddling the Hauts-de-Seine department communes of Courbevoie, La Garenne-Colombes, Nanterre and Puteaux. La Défense is primarily a business district and hosts a population of 25,000 permanent residents and 45,000 students. La Défense is also visited by 8,000,000 tourists each year and houses an open-air museum.

History

La Défense is named after the statue La Défense de Paris by Louis-Ernest Barrias, which was erected in 1883 to commemorate the soldiers who had defended Paris during the Franco-Prussian War.

The Centre of New Industries and Technologies (CNIT) was built and first used in 1958. In 1966, the Nobel Tower was the first office skyscraper built in the area. In 1970, the RER line A railway was opened from La Défense to Étoile. In 1974, a contract for a Défense-Cergy high-speed hovercraft train was signed and soon abandoned.

In the early 1970s, in response to great demand, a second generation of buildings began to appear, but the economic crisis in 1973 nearly halted all construction in the area. A third generation of towers began to appear in the early 1980s. The biggest shopping centre in Europe (at the time), the Quatre Temps, was created in 1981. In 1982, the EPAD launched the Tête Défense competition to find a monument to complete the Axe historique, which eventually led to the construction of Grande Arche at the west end of the quarter. During the same period, hotels were constructed, the CNIT was restructured, and in 1992, Line 1 of the Paris Métro was extended to La Défense, which made the area readily accessible to even more of the city.

On Bastille Day 1990, French electronic composer Jean-Michel Jarre staged an ambitious concert at the site, using the Grande Arche and three of the area's towers as projection screens, and building a pyramidal stage above the road. The free concert, titled simply Paris la Defense, attracted two million spectators, stretching all the way back to the Arc de Triomphe. This beat Jarre's own previous world record for the largest attendance for a musical concert.
After Jean Michel Jarre, German DJ Sash! and the singer La Trec have set at La Défense the video clip for their song Stay in 1997.

After a stagnation in new development in the mid-1990s, La Défense is once again expanding and is now the largest purpose-built business district in Europe.

Important corporations headquartered at La Défense include Neuf Cegetel, Société Générale, TotalEnergies, Aventis, Areva, and Arcelor. The tallest skyscraper, the Tour First belongs to AXA, constructed in 1974.

On 9 September 2008, La Défense celebrated its 50th anniversary with a huge fireworks display.

In December 2005, Bernard Bled, CEO & Chairman of EPAD (La Defense Management & Development Office) announced an ambitious 9-year development plan called "La Defense 2006–2015". This important modernisation plan has to give a new dimension to the district and focuses on four main axes: regenerate outdated skyscrapers, allow new buildings, improve the balance between offices and residential housing and make the transport of local employees from their homes to La Défense easier. There are 3 aims: building  of offices within demolition/rebuilding projects, building  of offices within new projects, and building  of housing.

The government confirmed in July 2006 this plan, which has to be carried out around 2015. It is justified by the strong estate pressure, which plays in favour of building new skyscrapers near Paris. Those constructions have also the advantage to be more economical than little buildings. But it will have to overcome some difficulties: French economy faces a short-term slowdown; the government tries to balance tertiary sector employment in the whole region again, because La Défense today concentrates a major part of those jobs; and traffic is already saturated in the district, while it would need huge investments to extend transport infrastructures.

During said December 2005 Press Conference, EPAD released to the public an elaborate 3D animation film titled "La Défense 2016".

Education 
Paris La Défense brings together the cluster of Leonardo da Vinci University Center and 5 business schools: EDC Paris Business School, ESSEC Business School, ICN Graduate Business School, IESEG School of Management and SKEMA Business School. It is also home to the European School of Paris-La Défense, an international primary and secondary school that was accredited as a European School in 2020.

Area specifications
 Divided into 4 major sectors
 
  of offices
 1,500 businesses
 180,000 employees
 20,000 residents
  of shops (including the  Quatre Temps Shopping Mall)
 2,600 hotel rooms
  of flagstone and sidewalk
  of greenery
 60 modern art sculptures and monuments

Open-air museum
Besides the representative architecture, the area also houses an open-air museum with 70 statues and pieces of modern art, including the following works:

César, Thumb (1965)
Joan Miró, Two fantastic characters (1976)
Alexander Calder, Red Spider (1976)
Yaacov Agam, Fountain (1977)
Richard Serra, Slat (1982)
Shelomo Selinger, The Dance (1983)
Bernar Venet, Two Indeterminate Lines (1988)
Takis, Bright Trees (1990) 
Igor Mitoraj, Tindaro (1997)
Emily Young, Four Heads (2002)
Patrick Blanc, Green wall (2006)
Louis-Ernest Barrias, La Défense de Paris (1883)
François Morellet, La Défonce (1990)
Guillaume Bottazzi, Peinture de 216 m² (2014)

Highrise buildings

Completed highrise buildings above 50 m (164 ft) (1967–2023)

Upcoming highrise buildings (2023–2027)

Canceled projects
 Tour Sans Fins (1989): 
 Hermitage Plaza (2022): 
 Tour Generali (2011): 
 Tour Signal (2009): 
 Tour Phare (2018):

See also

 List of tallest buildings and structures in the Paris region

References

Further reading
 Schaugg, Johannes: High-Rise Buildings – La Défense, Books on Demand 2009, .

External links

 Satellite image from Google Maps
 La Défense de Paris
 Site officiel de l'EPAD (Établissement Public pour l'Aménagement de la Défense) 
 Connecting-Paris, web site created by the Chamber of commerce and industry of Paris to help companies setting up in La Defense 
 Expatriates Magazine, A printed publication distributed within various corporations situated in La Defense helping international employees integrate within the workplace and city 
 Les bâtiments de la Défense 
 Structurae: Structural engineering and architecture guide to Paris-La Défense 

 
Financial districts in France
Central business districts in France
Economy of Paris
Tourist attractions in Hauts-de-Seine